Kohak may refer to:
Erazim Kohák, Czech writer
Kohak, Markazi, a village in Iran
Kohak, Razavi Khorasan, a village in Iran

See also
Kahak (disambiguation)